John Louis Mansi (born John Patrick Adams; 8 November 1926 – 6 August 2010) was a British television and film actor whose career spanned the years from the early 1950s to the early 1990s.

Born in London to an Italian father and an Irish mother, he served in the merchant navy and the RAF during World War II. Upon becoming an actor, he chose his father's surname as his stage name, later adopting the name Louis after Louie Dumbrowski, the character played by Bernard Gorcey in The Bowery Boys film series, whom his friends claimed he resembled.

He was best known for his role as Engelbert von Smallhausen (although in the BBC books he is named as Bobby Cedric von Smallhausen) in the popular BBC sitcom 'Allo 'Allo! in seasons 2 to 9. He also appeared in Department S (as "Maxime" in the episode "The Treasure of the Costa del Sol", 1969), the Ripping Yarns story "Across the Andes By Frog", and the Hammer House of Horror story "The Thirteenth Reunion". His film appearances have included The Small World of Sammy Lee (1963), the Beatles' film Help! (1965), the original version of The Italian Job (1969), Tales from the Crypt (1972), and the Dick Emery film Ooh... You Are Awful (1972).

After 'Allo 'Allo! ended in 1992, he retired from acting. He was often credited as Louis Mansi in his roles. For six years he suffered from Parkinson's disease and in May 2010 was diagnosed with terminal lung cancer. His interests included reading, letter writing, animal welfare and watching DVDs/videos of past favourite series/films.

Filmography

References

External links

Obituary in The Independent

1926 births
2010 deaths
Military personnel from London
Male actors from London
English people of Italian descent
English people of Irish descent
British Merchant Navy personnel of World War II
Royal Air Force personnel of World War II
Deaths from lung cancer in England
English male film actors
English male television actors
People with Parkinson's disease
British male comedy actors